Pillai or Pillay, meaning "Child of King (Prince)", is a surname found among the Tamil and Malayalam-speaking people of India and Sri Lanka. It has been in traditional use by the communities such as the Vellalars,  and the Nairs also some Brahmins.

Origin 
According to epigraphic records, Pillai is an ancient title that was used as a suffix that goes back to the Tamil Sangam Era and was given to junior members of the royal family. Originally a title meaning "royal child", it came to be given to administrators of temples; often holding large estates on behalf of the latter.

Early English records also address these hereditary ruling chiefs as the princes of Kerala ranking below the monarch. The most well known are the Pillais of the Eight Noble Houses, the Ettuveettil Pillamar of Travancore.

Tamil inscriptions define the direct meaning of Pillai as "Child of King" (prince), denoting nobility. The title occur both as a single name or as a suffix to the name.

People 
Notable people with this surname or its variants include:

 
 Ashan Pillai (born in Sri Lanka, 1969), British violist and academic
 A. R. Pillai (1879–1938), Indian freedom fighter
 Anton Sebastianpillai (1944/5–2020), author and consultant geriatrician
 Ananda Ranga Pillai (1709–1761), dubash in the service of French East India Company
 Ariranga Pillay (born 1945), former Chief Justice and briefly Acting President of Mauritius
 Arumuka Navalar, born as Kandarpillai Arumugapillai, a Sri Lankan Hindu reformer
 Bastiampillai Anthonipillai Thomas (1886–1964), Sri Lankan Tamil priest and founder of Rosarians Order
 Bastiampillai Deogupillai (1917–2003), Sri Lankan Tamil Roman Catholic bishop
 B. Ravi Pillai (born 1953), Indian entrepreneur
 C. W. Thamotharampillai (1832–1901), publisher of ancient Tamil texts
 Candice Pillay (born 1981), singer and songwriter
 Changampuzha Krishna Pillai, Malayalam poet
 Chempakaraman Pillai (1891–1934), freedom fighter from Travancore of Tamil descent
 Chinna Migapillai, 17th century feudal lord and rebel leader from the Jaffna Kingdom
 Devasahayam Pillai (1712–1752), Indian court official, controversial convert to Christianity
 Dhanraj Pillay (born 1968), Indian hockey player
 G. P. Pillai (1864–1903), barrister, established the first English newspaper in South India
 G. Parameswaran Pillai (1890–1963), Dewan of Travancore
 Gerald Pillay (born 1953), South African theologian and ecclesiastical historian, Vice Chancellor and Rector of Liverpool Hope University.
 Gooty Kesava Pillai (1860–1933), Indian journalist and freedom-fighter. Delegate from Anantapur, Andhra Pradesh at the first session of the Indian National Congress.
 Jerry Pillay (born 1965), South African Reformed pastor, theologian and General Secretary of the World Council of Churches.
 K. C. Pillai (1900–1970), Bishop-at-large of the Indian Orthodox Church, Antiochean Succession, Chennai (Madras), India
 K. Appavu Pillai (1911–1973), Indian politician
 K. C. Sreedharan Pillai (1920–1985), Indian mathematician
 K. Perumal Pillai, Indian politician
 K. Thamboosamy Pillay (1850–1902), a prominent member of the Tamil community in British Malaya
 Kavimani Desigavinayagam Pillai (1876–1954), Indian freedom fighter, poet
 L. D. Swamikannu Pillai (1865–1925), Indian astronomer, Speaker of Tamil Nadu Assembly
 M. M. Pareed Pillay, former Chief Justice of Kerala
 M. P. Narayana Pillai (1939–1998), Malayalam writer
 M. K. Mackar Pillay (1880–1966), Indian industrialist and politician
 Manonmaniam Sundaram Pillai (1855–1897), eminent writer in Tamil literature; his poem "Niraarum Kadal Udutha" is the official Tamil Anthem
 Maraimalai Adigal (Nagai Vedachalam Pillai, 1876–1950), eminent Tamil orator and writer, started Pure Tamil movement Tanittamil Iyakkam
 Marimutthu Pillai (1712–1787), musician
 Maruthanayagam Pillai (1725–1764), Indian soldier and administrator also known as Muhammed Yusuf Khan
 Murali Pillai, Singaporean politician of Indian descent
 Nadakkal Parameswaran Pillai (born 1931), leader of Indian Coffee House movement
 Naraina Pillai, social entrepreneur and businessman
 Navanethem Pillay (born 1941), South African judge, UN High Commissioner for Human Rights
 Nisha Pillai, Indian-born journalist and BBC news anchor
 P. Govinda Pillai (1926–2012), Communist Party of India leader
 P. K. Narayana Pillai, scholar of Sanskrit and Malayalam literature
 Palani Subramaniam Pillai (1908–1962), Carnatic music percussionist
 Paravoor T. K. Narayana Pillai (1890–1971), Indian freedom fighter
 Pattom A. Thanu Pillai (1885–1970), Second Chief Minister of unified Kerala, Communist leader
 Periyapillai, 16th century king of the Jaffna Kingdom
 Pradani Muthirulappa Pillai, 18th-century minister of Ramnad during the reign of Muthuramalinga Sethupathy
 Prem Nath Pillai (born 1982), Malaysia-based filmmaker and editor
 R. Balakrishna Pillai (1935–2021), State minister in Kerala
 Rajmohan Pillai (born 1964), Indian businessman
 Ranj Pillai (born 1974) is a Canadian politician and premier of Yukon.
 Rhea Pillai, Indian model
 Simone Ashwini Pillai, British Actress of Tamil native

 Sreekanteswaram Padmanabha Pillai (1864–1946), lexicographer
 Subbayya Sivasankaranarayana Pillai (1901–1950), Indian mathematician
 Swadeshabhimani Ramakrishna Pillai (1878–1916), journalist and political activist. Translated Karl Marx's biography into Malayalam
 T. S. Ramasamy Pillai (1918–2006), Freedom-fighter, politician and former Member of the Legislative Assembly (India)
 Thakazhi Sivasankara Pillai (1912–1999), Malayalam author
 Trevin Callistus Bastiampillai  (born 1985), Sri Lankan Canadian cricketer
 Vella Pillay (1923-2004), South African economist and political activist
 V. N. Rajasekharan Pillai (born 1949), current Vice Chancellor of Indira Gandhi National Open University (IGNOU)
 V. O. Chidambaram Pillai (1872–1936), Indian freedom fighter, popularly known as V.O.C. and as Kappalottiya Tamilan
 Venkatarama Ramalingam Pillai (Namakkal Kavignar Ramalingam Pillai, 1888–1972), poet and freedom fighter

References

Indian surnames